Madonna and Child with Saints is an undated oil on panel painting by Cima da Conegliano, now in the Nivaagaards Malerisamling in Nivå, Denmark. Its small size means it was probably a devotional image for a private house.

References

Paintings of the Madonna and Child by Cima da Conegliano
Paintings of saints
Paintings in Denmark